Roberto César may refer to:

 Roberto César (footballer, born 1955), Brazilian footballer
 Roberto César (footballer, born 1985), Brazilian footballer